Ernest Victor McDonald (26 January 1883 – 30 September 1971) was an Australian rules footballer who played with Richmond in the Victorian Football League (VFL).

Notes

External links 

1883 births
1971 deaths
Australian rules footballers from Melbourne
Richmond Football Club players
People from South Melbourne